The 1958–59 Connecticut Huskies men's basketball team represented the University of Connecticut in the 1958–59 collegiate men's basketball season. The Huskies completed the season with a 17–7 overall record. The Huskies were members of the Yankee Conference, where they ended the season with an 8–2 record. They were the Yankee Conference regular season champions and made it to the first round in the 1959 NCAA Division I men's basketball tournament. The Huskies played their home games at Hugh S. Greer Field House in Storrs, Connecticut, and were led by thirteenth-year head coach Hugh Greer.

Schedule 

|-
!colspan=12 style=""| Regular Season

|-
!colspan=12 style=""| NCAA Tournament

Schedule Source:

References 

UConn Huskies men's basketball seasons
Connecticut
Connecticut
1958 in sports in Connecticut
1959 in sports in Connecticut